Sir Henry Jebb (died 1811) was the president of the Royal College of Surgeons in Ireland (RCSI) in 1800.

Henry Jebb set up practice as a surgeon and man-midwife in 1777 in Dublin. For services of an obstetric nature, rendered in Dublin Castle, he received in 1782 the honour of knighthood from the Lord Lieutenant. Jebb was one of the original members of the Dublin Surgeons' Society, and was elected a member of the Royal College of Surgeons in Ireland at their first meeting. For many years he was a surgeon to Mercer's Hospital. He rivalled Surgeon Hume as a builder, having erected a large number of houses in North Frederick-street, winch he named after his son. The latter part of Jebb's life was chiefly spent in a house in Grafton-street. He died in 1811, at Dromartin House, which he had built, near Dundrum, County of Dublin, and was buried in the little churchyard at Glasnevin Village, County of Dublin.

References 

Presidents of the Royal College of Surgeons in Ireland
Irish surgeons
1811 deaths
Year of birth unknown
Irish knights
Physician-accoucheurs
Medical doctors from Dublin (city)